Michael Jeffrey Clark (born October 3, 1946) is an American drummer. He gained worldwide recognition as one of America's foremost jazz and funk drummers while playing with Herbie Hancock in the early 1970s. His incisive playing on Hancock's Actual Proof garnered him an international cult following and influenced generations of drummers throughout the world.

Clark was born in Sacramento, California, United States.  He traveled around the country with his father, a drummer himself and a union man for the railroad. His dad had a great appreciation for jazz and blues music, and Mike absorbed the music of America while riding the rails.  He credits this exposure as forming the foundation for his ability to synthesize many different regional styles.  From age 4, he was a prodigy, sitting in - and getting "house"- with bands in Texas and New Orleans. By the time he reached his early twenties he was known as one of the founders of the distinctive East Bay Sound coming out of Oakland, California.

Mike has performed with such well-known jazz greats as Herbie Hancock, Christian McBride, Chet Baker, John Scofield, Nicholas Payton, Tony Bennett, Wayne Shorter, Joe Henderson, Eddie Henderson, Bobby Hutcherson, Vince Guaraldi, Woody Shaw, Donald Harrison, Albert King, Larry Coryell, Michael Wolff, Wallace Roney, Billy Childs, Dr. Lonnie Smith, Chris Potter, Bobby McFerrin, Nat Adderley, Oscar Brown Jr., and Gil Evans and his orchestra.

His album Blueprints of Jazz, Vol. 1 (Talking House Records, 2008) was widely praised by critics and in 2010 was named by DownBeat magazine as one of the best albums of the decade. The album is part of the Blueprints of Jazz series conceived, produced and recorded by Talking House Productions with an aim to expose the histories and current work of important but often lesser-known jazz players who had contributed to the sounds of jazz legends from the 50’s, 60’s, and 70’s. Production and recording of the albums was helmed by Talking House producers Marc Weibel and Stephen Smith.

His latest recordings include "Retro Report" with Delbert Bump on Rope-a-Dope label, "Life Cycle" with Mark Sherman, Chase Baird, and Felix Pastorius, also on Rope-a-Dope; Eddie Henderson's "Be Cool" on the Smoke label; Charnett Moffett's "Music from Our Soul" on Motima; and "Indigo Blue: Live at the Iridium" with Christian McBride, Donald Harrison, Rob Dixon, Randy Brecker, and Antonio Farao on Highnote.

Clark endorses DW drums, Istanbul Agop cymbals, Evans drumheads, and Innovative Percussion drumsticks.  He has played Remo drumheads, Vic Firth drumsticks, Zildjian cymbals, and Paiste cymbals in the past.

Discography

References

External links
 Official Site  
 Drummerworld article on Mike Clark
 2012 Audio Interview with Mike Clark from the podcast "I'd Hit That"

1946 births
Living people
American funk drummers
American jazz drummers
Owl Studios artists
20th-century American drummers
American male drummers
20th-century American male musicians
American male jazz musicians
Brand X members
The Headhunters members